The 1981 Women's World Chess Championship was won by Maia Chiburdanidze, who successfully defended her title against challenger Nana Alexandria after a closely fought match, which ended in an 8-8 tie.

1979 Interzonals

Like the previous one, this championship cycle contained two Interzonal tournaments, held in Rio de Janeiro in September and Alicante in October 1979, featuring the best players from each FIDE zone. A total of 35 players took part, with the top three from Rio (17 players) and the top four from Alicante (18 players) qualifying for the Candidates' matches.

Ioseliani won convincingly in Rio, 2½ points ahead of Veroci-Petronic and Alexandria.

In Alicante, Lematschko and Akhmilovskaya shared first place, well ahead of Gurieli and Litinskaya. However, Lematschko subsequently defected from socialist Bulgaria and was unable to take part in the Candidates' matches, so her place was given to Fischdick as fourth-placed from the Rio Interzonal (on tie-breaks). Lematschko later settled in Switzerland and reached the Candidates' matches again in the following cycle, representing her new country.

{| class="wikitable"
|+ 1979 Women's Interzonal, Rio de Janeiro
|-
! !! Player !! 1 !! 2 !! 3 !! 4 !! 5 !! 6 !! 7 !! 8 !! 9 !! 10 !! 11 !! 12 !! 13 !! 14 !! 15 !! 16 !! 17 !! Points !! Tie break
|- style="background:#ccffcc;"
| 1 ||  || - || ½ || 1 || 1 || ½ || 1 || 1 || 1 || 1 || 1 || 1 || 1 || 1 || 1 || ½ || 1 || 1 || 14½ || 
|- style="background:#ccffcc;"
| 2 ||  || ½ || - || 1 || ½ || ½ || ½ || ½ || ½ || 1 || ½ || 1 || 1 || 1 || 1 || 1 || ½ || 1 || 12 || 
|- style="background:#ccffcc;"
| 3 ||  || 0 || 0 || - || ½ || ½ || 1 || 0 || 1 || 1 || 0 || 1 || 1 || 1 || 1 || 1 || 1 || 1 || 11 || 
|- style="background:#ccffcc;"
| 4 ||  || 0 || ½ || ½ || - || ½ || 1 || 1 || ½ || 1 || 1 || ½ || 0 || 1 || ½ || ½ || 1 || 1 || 10½ || 74.50
|-
| 5 ||  || ½ || ½ || ½ || ½ || - || ½ || 1 || ½ || ½ || ½ || ½ || 0 || 1 || 1 || 1 || 1 || 1 || 10½ || 73.50
|-
| 6 ||  || 0 || ½ || 0 || 0 || ½ || - || 1 || 1 || ½ || 1 || 1 || 1 || 0 || ½ || ½ || 1 || 1 || 9½ || 63.25
|-
| 7 ||  || 0 || ½ || 1 || 0 || 0 || 0 || - || 0 || 1 || 1 || 1 || 1 || 1 || 0 || 1 || 1 || 1 || 9½ || 60.50
|-
| 8 ||  || 0 || ½ || 0 || ½ || ½ || 0 || 1 || - || ½ || 0 || 0 || 1 || 1 || 1 || 1 || 1 || 1 || 9 || 55.50
|-
| 9 ||  || 0 || 0 || 0 || 0 || ½ || ½ || 0 || ½ || - || 1 || 1 || 1 || 1 || 1 || 1 || ½ || 1 || 9 || 54.25
|-
| 10 ||  || 0 || ½ || 1 || 0 || ½ || 0 || 0 || 1 || 0 || - || 1 || ½ || 0 || ½ || 1 || 1 || 1 || 8 || 
|-
| 11 ||  || 0 || 0 || 0 || ½ || ½ || 0 || 0 || 1 || 0 || 0 || - || 1 || ½ || 1 || 1 || 1 || 1 || 7½ || 
|-
| 12 ||  || 0 || 0 || 0 || 1 || 1 || 0 || 0 || 0 || 0 || ½ || 0 || - || 1 || ½ || ½ || 1 || 1 || 6½ || 38.50
|-
| 13 ||  || 0 || 0 || 0 || 0 || 0 || 1 || 0 || 0 || 0 || 1 || ½ || 0 || - || 1 || 1 || 1 || 1 || 6½ || 33.25
|-
| 14 ||  || 0 || 0 || 0 || ½ || 0 || ½ || 1 || 0 || 0 || ½ || 0 || ½ || 0 || - || 1 || 1 || 1 || 6 || 
|-
| 15 ||  || ½ || 0 || 0 || ½ || 0 || ½ || 0 || 0 || 0 || 0 || 0 || ½ || 0 || 0 || - || 1 || 1 || 4 || 
|-
| 16 ||  || 0 || ½ || 0 || 0 || 0 || 0 || 0 || 0 || ½ || 0 || 0 || 0 || 0 || 0 || 0 || - || ½ || 1½ || 
|-
| 17 ||  || 0 || 0 || 0 || 0 || 0 || 0 || 0 || 0 || 0 || 0 || 0 || 0 || 0 || 0 || 0 || ½ || - || ½ || 
|}

{| class="wikitable"
|+ 1979 Women's Interzonal, Alicante
|-
! !! Player !! 1 !! 2 !! 3 !! 4 !! 5 !! 6 !! 7 !! 8 !! 9 !! 10 !! 11 !! 12 !! 13 !! 14 !! 15 !! 16 !! 17 !! 18 !! Points !! Tie break
|-
| 1 ||  || - || ½ || 1 || 1 || 1 || ½ || 1 || 1 || 0 || 1 || ½ || ½ || ½ || 1 || 1 || 1 || 1 || 1 || 13½ || 107.75
|- style="background:#ccffcc;"
| 2 ||  || ½ || - || ½ || 1 || 0 || 1 || 1 || 1 || 1 || 1 || 0 || 1 || ½ || 1 || 1 || 1 || 1 || 1 || 13½ || 104.50
|- style="background:#ccffcc;"
| 3 ||  || 0 || ½ || - || 0 || 0 || 1 || ½ || 1 || 1 || ½ || ½ || 1 || 1 || 1 || 1 || 1 || 1 || 1 || 12 || 
|- style="background:#ccffcc;"
| 4 ||  || 0 || 0 || 1 || - || 0 || 0 || 0 || 1 || ½ || 1 || 1 || 1 || 1 || 1 || 1 || 1 || 1 || 1 || 11½ || 
|-
| 5 ||  || 0 || 1 || 1 || 1 || - || ½ || 0 || 0 || 0 || 1 || 1 || ½ || ½ || 1 || 1 || ½ || 1 || 1 || 11 || 
|-
| 6 ||  || ½ || 0 || 0 || 1 || ½ || - || 0 || 0 || 1 || 0 || ½ || 1 || 1 || 1 || 1 || 1 || 1 || 1 || 10½ || 
|-
| 7 ||  || 0 || 0 || ½ || 1 || 1 || 1 || - || 1 || 1 || ½ || ½ || 1 || ½ || 0 || 0 || 0 || 1 || 1 || 10 || 
|-
| 8 ||  || 0 || 0 || 0 || 0 || 1 || 1 || 0 || - || ½ || 1 || ½ || ½ || 0 || ½ || 1 || 1 || 1 || 1 || 9 || 
|-
| 9 ||  || 1 || 0 || 0 || ½ || 1 || 0 || 0 || ½ || - || 1 || 1 || 0 || ½ || ½ || 0 || ½ || 1 || 1 || 8½ || 65.25
|-
| 10 ||  || 0 || 0 || ½ || 0 || 0 || 1 || ½ || 0 || 0 || - || ½ || 0 || 1 || 1 || 1 || 1 || 1 || 1 || 8½ || 54.50
|-
| 11 ||  || ½ || 1 || ½ || 0 || 0 || ½ || ½ || ½ || 0 || ½ || - || ½ || ½ || 0 || 1 || ½ || ½ || 1 || 8 || 64.75
|-
| 12 ||  || ½ || 0 || 0 || 0 || ½ || 0 || 0 || ½ || 1 || 1 || ½ || - || 1 || 1 || 0 || 1 || ½ || ½ || 8 || 58.25
|-
| 13 ||  || ½ || ½ || 0 || 0 || ½ || 0 || ½ || 1 || ½ || 0 || ½ || 0 || - || ½ || 1 || 0 || 1 || 0 || 6½ || 53.00
|-
| 14 ||  || 0 || 0 || 0 || 0 || 0 || 0 || 1 || ½ || ½ || 0 || 1 || 0 || ½ || - || 0 || 1 || 1 || 1 || 6½ || 40.00
|-
| 15 ||  || 0 || 0 || 0 || 0 || 0 || 0 || 1 || 0 || 1 || 0 || 0 || 1 || 0 || 1 || - || 0 || 1 || 1 || 6 || 
|-
| 16 ||  || 0 || 0 || 0 || 0 || ½ || 0 || 1 || 0 || ½ || 0 || ½ || 0 || 1 || 0 || 1 || - || 0 || ½ || 5 || 
|-
| 17 ||  || 0 || 0 || 0 || 0 || 0 || 0 || 0 || 0 || 0 || 0 || ½ || ½ || 0 || 0 || 0 || 1 || - || ½ || 2½ || 14.25
|-
| 18 ||  || 0 || 0 || 0 || 0 || 0 || 0 || 0 || 0 || 0 || 0 || 0 || ½ || 1 || 0 || 0 || ½ || ½ || - || 2½ || 14.25
|}

1980–81 Candidates' matches

The seven qualifiers from the two Interzonals were joined by ex-champion Gaprindashvili, who had been seeded into the tournament.

These eight players contested a knock-out series of matches. The semifinal Ioseliani-Gaprindashvili ended 7-7; in the end, Ioseliani won the lucky draw and advanced to the final. Here she lost to Alexandria, who earned the right to challenge the reigning champion for the second time (after 1975).

1981 Championship Match

The championship match was played in Borjomi and Tbilisi in 1981. A tough match went the full 16 games and ended in an 8-8 tie, with champion Chiburdanidze thus retaining her title.

{| class="wikitable" style="text-align:center"
|+Women's World Championship Match 1981
|-
! !! 1 !! 2 !! 3 !! 4 !! 5 !! 6 !! 7 !! 8 !! 9 !! 10 !! 11 !! 12 !! 13 !! 14 !! 15 !! 16 !! Total
|-
| align=left | 
| ½ ||style="background:black; color:white"| ½ || ½ ||style="background:black; color:white"| ½ || 0 ||style="background:black; color:white"| 1 || 1 ||style="background:black; color:white"| ½ || 1 ||style="background:black; color:white"| 0 || 0 ||style="background:black; color:white"| ½ || ½ ||style="background:black; color:white"| ½ || 1 ||style="background:black; color:white"| 0 || 8
|-
| align=left | 
|style="background:black; color:white"| ½ || ½ ||style="background:black; color:white"| ½ || ½ ||style="background:black; color:white"| 1 || 0 ||style="background:black; color:white"| 0 || ½ ||style="background:black; color:white"| 0 || 1 ||style="background:black; color:white"| 1 || ½ ||style="background:black; color:white"| ½ || ½ ||style="background:black; color:white"| 0 || 1 || 8
|}

References

Women's World Chess Championships
1981 in chess